Karel Steiner (26 January 1895 – 29 April 1934) was a Czechoslovak footballer. He competed in the men's tournament at the 1920 Summer Olympics. On a club level, he played for FK Viktoria Žižkov and AC Sparta Prague.

References

External links
 

1895 births
1934 deaths
Czech footballers
Czechoslovak footballers
Czechoslovakia international footballers
Olympic footballers of Czechoslovakia
Footballers at the 1920 Summer Olympics
Footballers from Prague
FK Viktoria Žižkov players
AC Sparta Prague players
Association football defenders